The Fantastic Adventures scandal was a 2019 scandal in involving the YouTube channel Fantastic Adventures, run by Machelle Hackney Hobson of Maricopa, Arizona, United States. The scandal began when one of Hobson's biological children contacted the police after witnessing her adopted siblings (Felipe, Summer, Elijah, Hailey, Jacob, Grayson and one unidentified child) being systematically abused by her mother. Fantastic Adventures gained worldwide media attention because of Hobson's motive of abuse towards the adopted children.

Background
On June 17, 2012, Machelle Hackney Hobson created a YouTube channel, Fantastic Adventures, which would feature videos starring her seven adopted children. The channel ultimately attracted more than 800 thousand subscribers, more than 350 million views,  and netted at least tens of thousands of dollars in revenue. 

In 2017, a child that was involved in Hobson's videos was seen streaking through the neighborhood, raising suspicions among the neighbors. According to the Arizona Department of Child Safety, she was investigated 9 times, but no proof of abuse was found.

In March 2019, after receiving a tip from Hobson's biological adult daughter, Megan Hobson, police visited the Hobson home for a welfare check. The police found that the children appeared to be malnourished, and several of the children reported that Hobson had subjected them to abuse: one daughter said that Hobson had once pepper sprayed her vagina, and a son reported that Hobson had subjected him to beatings and pinched the tip of his penis with her nails until it bled. The children reported that Hobson would frequently abuse them if they refused to perform in a Fantastic Adventures video or if their performance did not meet Hobson's standards.

Hobson was detained along with her biological sons, Logan and Ryan, who were arrested in relation to their failure to report their mother's abuse but were ultimately not charged.

Death
In May 2019, Hobson suffered a non-trauma-related brain injury at Pinal County Jail, and she was transferred to a local hospital. Her health subsequently deteriorated, and a judge declared her "incompetent to stand trial but restorable"—a designation that gave state officials 15 months to restore Hobson to legal competency. Instead,
Hobson died in a Scottsdale hospital on November 12, 2019, and the charges against her were dismissed as a result of her passing. All seven children were removed from the home and placed into foster care after Hobson's death, and Fantastic Adventures's earnings were sent to the children who had appeared on the channel.

Reactions
 Torrie Taj, CEO of Child Crisis Arizona, called the mother behind the scandal a "master manipulator" and stated that Hobson did not have the qualification to adopt children.
 YouTube announced that it would be working with the National Center for Missing and Exploited Children to find any users who were abusing children and that anyone who was convicted would have their channel terminated.

See also
 DaddyOFive, a similar scandal involving a channel carrying out child abuse on YouTube

References

External links
 Instagram page

2012 establishments in Arizona
2019 scandals
2019 disestablishments in Arizona
21st-century American criminals
American YouTubers
American women comedians
American directors
Child abuse in the United States
Child abuse incidents and cases
People from Arizona
YouTube channels closed in 2019
YouTube channels launched in 2012
YouTube controversies
Scandals in Arizona
Entertainment scandals
Ableism
21st-century American women